RailNetEurope (RNE) is a non-profit association whose aim is to enable fast and easy access to the European rail network, as well as to increase the quality and efficiency of international rail traffic. RNE does not operate any train services; this is done by Railway Undertakings (RUs), also known as Train Operators, who cannot be members of RNE.

History 
RailNetEurope was founded in January 2004, after a symbolic launch and the signing of a co-operation agreement on joint marketing of international freight train paths at InnoTrans in Berlin in September 2002.

Aims

The aim of the association is to provide support to Railway Undertakings (RUs) in their international activities (both for freight and passengers) and increase the efficiency of the Infrastructure Managers’ processes. Together, the Members of RailNetEurope are working on the harmonisation of international rail transport conditions and procedures in the field of international rail infrastructure management – which are very different in Europe – whilst introducing a corporate approach to promote the European railway business for the benefit of the entire rail industry across Europe.

One-Stop-Shop principle

RNE members strive to act as a single European Rail Infrastructure Company in the field of international rail traffic. This is embedded in the One-Stop-Shop (OSS) principle, whereby various international products and services are handled at a single point of contact for the entire international route.
Thus RNE has established a network of OSS representatives, one for each rail infrastructure, who are the personal contact points for all customer care issues.

Tasks

The tasks of the organisation are carried out by standing working groups and ad hoc project groups co-ordinated by the RNE Joint Office, which is based in Vienna, Austria. 
RNE provides support to its members as regards compliance with the European legal framework. A good example of this is the development of harmonised international processes, templates and guidelines. Many of these services can now assist the IMs with fulfilling requirements imposed by a new European Union Regulation: Regulation (EU) No 913/2010 of the European Parliament and of the Council of 22 September 2010 concerning a European rail network for competitive freight. Thus the RNE General Assembly decided that RNE should become ‘the service provider of choice and expert support provider for Freight Corridor Organisations in the areas of developing methods and processes, and developing and operating tools’.
In its daily work, the association strives to simplify, harmonise and optimise international rail processes such as:
- Europe-wide timetabling,
- common sales approaches (including annual Network Statements published by rail Infrastructure Managers),
- co-operation between IMs in the field of operations,
- train information exchange in real time across Europe's borders (e.g. monitoring of train movements),
- after-sales services (e.g. reporting on train movements, including delays).

Members and network

When RailNetEurope was launched in January 2004, it had 16 founding members. RNE currently counts 37 full members and 9 associate members from all corners of Europe. These are either rail Infrastructure Managers or Allocation Bodies. Their networks span 26 different countries, totalling over 230,000 kilometres of railway lines.

IT at the service of the railways

Much of RailNetEurope's work consists of developing IT systems supporting the harmonisation of conditions and procedures in international rail infrastructure management. Currently, the following three IT systems are in use.

References

External links 
 RailNetEurope (RNE) Website
 RailNetEurope (RNE) Members & Network
 Path Coordination System (PCS) Website
 Train Information System (TIS) Website
 Charging Information System (CIS) Website

International rail transport organizations
Railway associations